Eastern section of the Western Beskids are a set of mountain ranges spanning the southern Polish and northern Slovak border. They constitute an eastern section of the Western Beskids, within the Outer Western Carpathians.

In geographic classification, the term Beskid Mountains has several definitions, related to distinctive historical and linguistic traditions. Depending on a particular classification, designation Eastern in relation to the Beskids is also used with different meanings. In Slovak terminology, the term Eastern Beskids is used to designate the eastern section of the Western Beskids. In Polish terminology, the same region is also classified as the eastern section of the Western Beskids, but not under the term Eastern Beskids, since that term is used to designate Eastern Beskids of the Outer Eastern Carpathians.

Subdivisions
The Eastern section of the Western Beskids consist of:

 Beskid Sądecki + Ľubovňa Highlands
 Čergov
 Pieniny

See also
 Divisions of the Carpathians
 Outer Western Carpathians
 Western Beskids
 Central section of the Western Beskids

References

Sources

 
 
 
 

Mountain ranges of Slovakia
Mountain ranges of Poland
Mountain ranges of the Western Carpathians